Mill Creek is one of the three tributaries of the Neshaminy Creek bearing the name and one of six Mill Creeks in Bucks County, Pennsylvania.

Statistics
Mill Creek meets the Neshaminy Creek at the Neshaminy's 36.40 river mile. It drains a Watershed of .The Geographic Name Information System I.D. is 1181119, U.S. Department of the Interior Geological Survey I.D. is 02638.

Course
Rising near the intersection of Limekiln Pike (Pennsylvania Route 152) and Stump Road from an unnamed pond, Mill Creek flows southeast for a very short distance whereupon it runs a little less than  picking up two unnamed tributaries from the right, then for a very short distance it curls to the north where it meets the Neshaminy Creek.

Municipalities
Bucks County
Doylestown Township
Warrington Township

Crossings and Bridges

See also
List of rivers of Pennsylvania
List of rivers of the United States
List of Delaware River tributaries

References

Rivers of Pennsylvania
Tributaries of the Neshaminy Creek
Rivers of Bucks County, Pennsylvania